Live & Learn is the fourth studio album by American hard rock band Vixen, released on November 6, 2006, in Europe and on January 30, 2007, in the United States. The band's line-up performing on this album was formed in 2001 with the only original member guitarist Jan Kuehnemund. This is the last studio album featuring Kuehnemund, who died in 2013, and the only studio album for this line-up as returning members Janet Gardner, Roxy Petrucci, Share Ross, and Gina Stile took on the Vixen name after the remaining members negotiated the best step to take after Kuehnemund's death, which was to allow the surviving classic members to reunite.

Track listing

Personnel
Vixen
 Jenna Sanz-Agero – lead and backing vocals
 Jan Kuehnemund – guitars, backing vocals
 Lynn Louise Lowrey – bass, backing vocals
 Kathrin Kraft – drums, additional backing vocals on "Suffragette City"

Additional musicians
 Chris Fayz – keyboards on "Little Voice" and "Give Me Away"
 Randy Wooten – keyboards on "Suffragette City"
 Paulie Cerra – saxophone on "Suffragette City"
 Robert Lear – bagpipe on "Give Me Away"

Production
Dennis MacKay – producer, engineer, mixing
Brian Gardner – mastering

References

External links

Vixen (band) albums
2006 albums